Transco was founded in October 1936, with its business mainly focused on servicing the railroad industry.  In 1984, the company was restructured, with Transco Inc. now serving as the parent company for a number of subsidiary corporations, including Transco Railway Products Inc., Transco Products Inc., and Advance Thermal Corp. Transco Railway Products Inc. has its corporate offices in Chicago, Illinois and operates seven separate manufacturing facilities located strategically in major rail transportation corridors.

Company Website
Transco Railway Products Inc.

External media coverage
 Logansport's Transco Railway Products and union reach tentative agreement
 Johnstown America begins coal-car deliveries for FirstEnergy

Companies based in Chicago
United States railroad holding companies